The cells of the dorsal nucleus of vagus nerve are spindle-shaped, like those of the posterior column of the spinal cord, and the nucleus is usually considered as representing the base of the posterior column. It measures about 2 cm. in length, and in the lower, closed part of the medulla oblongata is situated behind the dorsal nucleus of the vagus; whereas in the upper, open part it lies lateral to that nucleus, and corresponds to an eminence, named the vagal trigone (ala cinerea), in the rhomboid fossa.

The vagal trigone is separated from the area postrema by a narrow strip of thickened  ependyma – the funiculus separans.

References

External links
 https://web.archive.org/web/20070927162218/http://www.ib.amwaw.edu.pl/anatomy/atlas/image_04be.htm

Brainstem